BISRA may refer to:

 British Iron and Steel Research Association, a metals technology industry research group in England.
 Bantry Inshore Search and Rescue Association, a registered charity providing emergency lifeboat service in Bantry Bay. 
 Bisra road, a public road in Rourkela, Orissa, India.